Veronika Voráčková (born June 21, 1999) is a Czech basketball player for USK Praha and the Czech national team.

She participated at the EuroBasket Women 2017.

References

1999 births
Living people
Sportspeople from České Budějovice
Shooting guards
Czech women's basketball players